Gregory Wentworth Mike (born 14 July 1966 in Nottingham) is an English former first-class cricketer active 1988–96 who played for Nottinghamshire.

His son Ben Mike is a first-class cricketer for Leicestershire.

References

1966 births
English cricketers
Nottinghamshire cricketers
Living people